Glory! Music of Rejoicing is a studio album by the Mormon Tabernacle Choir.  It topped the Billboard Traditional Classical Albums chart for five weeks in 2012.

Track listing

Charts

Year-end charts

References

Tabernacle Choir albums
2012 albums